Suhas Wadkar is an Indian politician served as a Deputy Mayor of Brihanmumbai Municipal Corporation, which is India's richest municipal corporation. He was elected as Deputy Mayor of Mumbai without any opposition.

References

Living people
Shiv Sena politicians
Marathi politicians
Maharashtra politicians
Year of birth missing (living people)